

Hu

Hub-Hum

|- class="vcard"
| class="fn org" | Hubbard's Hill
| class="adr" | Kent
| class="note" | 
| class="note" | 
|- class="vcard"
| class="fn org" | Hubberholme
| class="adr" | North Yorkshire
| class="note" | 
| class="note" | 
|- class="vcard"
| class="fn org" | Hubberston
| class="adr" | Pembrokeshire
| class="note" | 
| class="note" | 
|- class="vcard"
| class="fn org" | Hubbersty Head
| class="adr" | Cumbria
| class="note" | 
| class="note" | 
|- class="vcard"
| class="fn org" | Hubberton Green
| class="adr" | Calderdale
| class="note" | 
| class="note" | 
|- class="vcard"
| class="fn org" | Hubbert's Bridge
| class="adr" | Lincolnshire
| class="note" | 
| class="note" | 
|- class="vcard"
| class="fn org" | Huby
| class="adr" | Harrogate, North Yorkshire
| class="note" | 
| class="note" | 
|- class="vcard"
| class="fn org" | Huby
| class="adr" | Hambleton, North Yorkshire
| class="note" | 
| class="note" | 
|- class="vcard"
| class="fn org" | Hucclecote
| class="adr" | Gloucestershire
| class="note" | 
| class="note" | 
|- class="vcard"
| class="fn org" | Hucking
| class="adr" | Kent
| class="note" | 
| class="note" | 
|- class="vcard"
| class="fn org" | Hucknall
| class="adr" | Nottinghamshire
| class="note" | 
| class="note" | 
|- class="vcard"
| class="fn org" | Huddersfield
| class="adr" | Kirklees
| class="note" | 
| class="note" | 
|- class="vcard"
| class="fn org" | Huddington
| class="adr" | Worcestershire
| class="note" | 
| class="note" | 
|- class="vcard"
| class="fn org" | Huddisford
| class="adr" | Devon
| class="note" | 
| class="note" | 
|- class="vcard"
| class="fn org" | Huddlesford
| class="adr" | Staffordshire
| class="note" | 
| class="note" | 
|- class="vcard"
| class="fn org" | Hud Hey
| class="adr" | Lancashire
| class="note" | 
| class="note" | 
|- class="vcard"
| class="fn org" | Hudnall
| class="adr" | Hertfordshire
| class="note" | 
| class="note" | 
|- class="vcard"
| class="fn org" | Hudnalls
| class="adr" | Gloucestershire
| class="note" | 
| class="note" | 
|- class="vcard"
| class="fn org" | Hudswell
| class="adr" | North Yorkshire
| class="note" | 
| class="note" | 
|- class="vcard"
| class="fn org" | Hudswell
| class="adr" | Wiltshire
| class="note" | 
| class="note" | 
|- class="vcard"
| class="fn org" | Huggate
| class="adr" | East Riding of Yorkshire
| class="note" | 
| class="note" | 
|- class="vcard"
| class="fn org" | Hugglepit
| class="adr" | Devon
| class="note" | 
| class="note" | 
|- class="vcard"
| class="fn org" | Hugglescote
| class="adr" | Leicestershire
| class="note" | 
| class="note" | 
|- class="vcard"
| class="fn org" | Hughenden Valley
| class="adr" | Buckinghamshire
| class="note" | 
| class="note" | 
|- class="vcard"
| class="fn org" | Hughley
| class="adr" | Shropshire
| class="note" | 
| class="note" | 
|- class="vcard"
| class="fn org" | Hugh Mill
| class="adr" | Lancashire
| class="note" | 
| class="note" | 
|- class="vcard"
| class="fn org" | Hughton
| class="adr" | Highland
| class="note" | 
| class="note" | 
|- class="vcard"
| class="fn org" | Hugh Town
| class="adr" | Isles of Scilly
| class="note" | 
| class="note" | 
|- class="vcard"
| class="fn org" | Hugus
| class="adr" | Cornwall
| class="note" | 
| class="note" | 
|- class="vcard"
| class="fn org" | Huish (near Instow)
| class="adr" | Devon
| class="note" | 
| class="note" | 
|- class="vcard"
| class="fn org" | Huish (near Merton)
| class="adr" | Devon
| class="note" | 
| class="note" | 
|- class="vcard"
| class="fn org" | Huish
| class="adr" | Wiltshire
| class="note" | 
| class="note" | 
|- class="vcard"
| class="fn org" | Huish Champflower
| class="adr" | Somerset
| class="note" | 
| class="note" | 
|- class="vcard"
| class="fn org" | Huish Episcopi
| class="adr" | Somerset
| class="note" | 
| class="note" | 
|- class="vcard"
| class="fn org" | Hulcote
| class="adr" | Bedfordshire
| class="note" | 
| class="note" | 
|- class="vcard"
| class="fn org" | Hulcote
| class="adr" | Northamptonshire
| class="note" | 
| class="note" | 
|- class="vcard"
| class="fn org" | Hulcott
| class="adr" | Buckinghamshire
| class="note" | 
| class="note" | 
|- class="vcard"
| class="fn org" | Hulham
| class="adr" | Devon
| class="note" | 
| class="note" | 
|- class="vcard"
| class="fn org" | Hull
| class="adr" | East Riding of Yorkshire
| class="note" | 
| class="note" | 
|- class="vcard"
| class="fn org" | Hulland
| class="adr" | Derbyshire
| class="note" | 
| class="note" | 
|- class="vcard"
| class="fn org" | Hulland Moss
| class="adr" | Derbyshire
| class="note" | 
| class="note" | 
|- class="vcard"
| class="fn org" | Hulland Ward
| class="adr" | Derbyshire
| class="note" | 
| class="note" | 
|- class="vcard"
| class="fn org" | Hullavington
| class="adr" | Wiltshire
| class="note" | 
| class="note" | 
|- class="vcard"
| class="fn org" | Hull Bridge
| class="adr" | East Riding of Yorkshire
| class="note" | 
| class="note" | 
|- class="vcard"
| class="fn org" | Hullbridge
| class="adr" | Essex
| class="note" | 
| class="note" | 
|- class="vcard"
| class="fn org" | Hull End
| class="adr" | Derbyshire
| class="note" | 
| class="note" | 
|- class="vcard"
| class="fn org" | Hulme
| class="adr" | Trafford
| class="note" | 
| class="note" | 
|- class="vcard"
| class="fn org" | Hulme
| class="adr" | Cheshire
| class="note" | 
| class="note" | 
|- class="vcard"
| class="fn org" | Hulme
| class="adr" | Staffordshire
| class="note" | 
| class="note" | 
|- class="vcard"
| class="fn org" | Hulme End
| class="adr" | Staffordshire
| class="note" | 
| class="note" | 
|- class="vcard"
| class="fn org" | Hulme Walfield
| class="adr" | Cheshire
| class="note" | 
| class="note" | 
|- class="vcard"
| class="fn org" | Hulseheath
| class="adr" | Cheshire
| class="note" | 
| class="note" | 
|- class="vcard"
| class="fn org" | Hulverstone
| class="adr" | Isle of Wight
| class="note" | 
| class="note" | 
|- class="vcard"
| class="fn org" | Hulver Street
| class="adr" | Suffolk
| class="note" | 
| class="note" | 
|- class="vcard"
| class="fn org" | Humber
| class="adr" | Devon
| class="note" | 
| class="note" | 
|- class="vcard"
| class="fn org" | Humber
| class="adr" | Herefordshire
| class="note" | 
| class="note" | 
|- class="vcard"
| class="fn org" | Humberston
| class="adr" | North East Lincolnshire
| class="note" | 
| class="note" | 
|- class="vcard"
| class="fn org" | Humberstone
| class="adr" | City of Leicester
| class="note" | 
| class="note" | 
|- class="vcard"
| class="fn org" | Humberston Fitties
| class="adr" | North East Lincolnshire
| class="note" | 
| class="note" | 
|- class="vcard"
| class="fn org" | Humberton
| class="adr" | North Yorkshire
| class="note" | 
| class="note" | 
|- class="vcard"
| class="fn org" | Humbie
| class="adr" | East Lothian
| class="note" | 
| class="note" | 
|- class="vcard"
| class="fn org" | Humbledon
| class="adr" | Sunderland
| class="note" | 
| class="note" | 
|- class="vcard"
| class="fn org" | Humble Green
| class="adr" | Suffolk
| class="note" | 
| class="note" | 
|- class="vcard"
| class="fn org" | Humbleton
| class="adr" | East Riding of Yorkshire
| class="note" | 
| class="note" | 
|- class="vcard"
| class="fn org" | Humby
| class="adr" | Lincolnshire
| class="note" | 
| class="note" | 
|- class="vcard"
| class="fn org" | Hume
| class="adr" | Scottish Borders
| class="note" | 
| class="note" | 
|- class="vcard"
| class="fn org" | Humla
| class="adr" | Highland
| class="note" | 
| class="note" | 
|- class="vcard"
| class="fn org" | Hummersknott
| class="adr" | Darlington
| class="note" | 
| class="note" | 
|- class="vcard"
| class="fn org" | Humshaugh
| class="adr" | Northumberland
| class="note" | 
| class="note" | 
|}

Hun

|- class="vcard"
| class="fn org" | Huncoat
| class="adr" | Lancashire
| class="note" | 
| class="note" | 
|- class="vcard"
| class="fn org" | Huncote
| class="adr" | Leicestershire
| class="note" | 
| class="note" | 
|- class="vcard"
| class="fn org" | Hunda
| class="adr" | Orkney Islands
| class="note" | 
| class="note" | 
|- class="vcard"
| class="fn org" | Hundalee
| class="adr" | Scottish Borders
| class="note" | 
| class="note" | 
|- class="vcard"
| class="fn org" | Hundall
| class="adr" | Derbyshire
| class="note" | 
| class="note" | 
|- class="vcard"
| class="fn org" | Hunder Holm
| class="adr" | Shetland Islands
| class="note" | 
| class="note" | 
|- class="vcard"
| class="fn org" | Hunderthwaite
| class="adr" | Durham
| class="note" | 
| class="note" | 
|- class="vcard"
| class="fn org" | Hunderton
| class="adr" | Herefordshire
| class="note" | 
| class="note" | 
|- class="vcard"
| class="fn org" | Hundleby
| class="adr" | Lincolnshire
| class="note" | 
| class="note" | 
|- class="vcard"
| class="fn org" | Hundle Houses
| class="adr" | Lincolnshire
| class="note" | 
| class="note" | 
|- class="vcard"
| class="fn org" | Hundleshope
| class="adr" | Scottish Borders
| class="note" | 
| class="note" | 
|- class="vcard"
| class="fn org" | Hundleton
| class="adr" | Pembrokeshire
| class="note" | 
| class="note" | 
|- class="vcard"
| class="fn org" | Hundon
| class="adr" | Suffolk
| class="note" | 
| class="note" | 
|- class="vcard"
| class="fn org" | Hundred End
| class="adr" | Lancashire
| class="note" | 
| class="note" | 
|- class="vcard"
| class="fn org" | Hundred House
| class="adr" | Powys
| class="note" | 
| class="note" | 
|- class="vcard"
| class="fn org" | Huney
| class="adr" | Shetland Islands
| class="note" | 
| class="note" | 
|- class="vcard"
| class="fn org" | Hungarton
| class="adr" | Leicestershire
| class="note" | 
| class="note" | 
|- class="vcard"
| class="fn org" | Hungate
| class="adr" | Leeds
| class="note" | 
| class="note" | 
|- class="vcard"
| class="fn org" | Hungerford
| class="adr" | Somerset
| class="note" | 
| class="note" | 
|- class="vcard"
| class="fn org" | Hungerford
| class="adr" | Shropshire
| class="note" | 
| class="note" | 
|- class="vcard"
| class="fn org" | Hungerford (Waltham St Lawrence)
| class="adr" | Berkshire
| class="note" | 
| class="note" | 
|- class="vcard"
| class="fn org" | Hungerford (town)
| class="adr" | Berkshire
| class="note" | 
| class="note" | 
|- class="vcard"
| class="fn org" | Hungerford Green
| class="adr" | Berkshire
| class="note" | 
| class="note" | 
|- class="vcard"
| class="fn org" | Hungerford Newtown
| class="adr" | Berkshire
| class="note" | 
| class="note" | 
|- class="vcard"
| class="fn org" | Hunger Hill
| class="adr" | Lancashire
| class="note" | 
| class="note" | 
|- class="vcard"
| class="fn org" | Hunger Hill
| class="adr" | Bolton
| class="note" | 
| class="note" | 
|- class="vcard"
| class="fn org" | Hungershall Park
| class="adr" | Kent
| class="note" | 
| class="note" | 
|- class="vcard"
| class="fn org" | Hungerstone
| class="adr" | Herefordshire
| class="note" | 
| class="note" | 
|- class="vcard"
| class="fn org" | Hungerton
| class="adr" | Lincolnshire
| class="note" | 
| class="note" | 
|- class="vcard"
| class="fn org" | Hungladder
| class="adr" | Highland
| class="note" | 
| class="note" | 
|- class="vcard"
| class="fn org" | Hungreyhatton
| class="adr" | Shropshire
| class="note" | 
| class="note" | 
|- class="vcard"
| class="fn org" | Hunmanby
| class="adr" | North Yorkshire
| class="note" | 
| class="note" | 
|- class="vcard"
| class="fn org" | Hunmanby Moor
| class="adr" | North Yorkshire
| class="note" | 
| class="note" | 
|- class="vcard"
| class="fn org" | Hunningham
| class="adr" | Warwickshire
| class="note" | 
| class="note" | 
|- class="vcard"
| class="fn org" | Hunningham Hill
| class="adr" | Warwickshire
| class="note" | 
| class="note" | 
|- class="vcard"
| class="fn org" | Hunnington
| class="adr" | Worcestershire
| class="note" | 
| class="note" | 
|- class="vcard"
| class="fn org" | Hunny Hill
| class="adr" | Isle of Wight
| class="note" | 
| class="note" | 
|- class="vcard"
| class="fn org" | Hunsdon
| class="adr" | Hertfordshire
| class="note" | 
| class="note" | 
|- class="vcard"
| class="fn org" | Hunsdonbury
| class="adr" | Hertfordshire
| class="note" | 
| class="note" | 
|- class="vcard"
| class="fn org" | Hunsingore
| class="adr" | North Yorkshire
| class="note" | 
| class="note" | 
|- class="vcard"
| class="fn org" | Hunslet
| class="adr" | Leeds
| class="note" | 
| class="note" | 
|- class="vcard"
| class="fn org" | Hunslet Carr
| class="adr" | Leeds
| class="note" | 
| class="note" | 
|- class="vcard"
| class="fn org" | Hunsonby
| class="adr" | Cumbria
| class="note" | 
| class="note" | 
|- class="vcard"
| class="fn org" | Hunstanton
| class="adr" | Norfolk
| class="note" | 
| class="note" | 
|- class="vcard"
| class="fn org" | Hunstanworth
| class="adr" | Durham
| class="note" | 
| class="note" | 
|- class="vcard"
| class="fn org" | Hunsterson
| class="adr" | Cheshire
| class="note" | 
| class="note" | 
|- class="vcard"
| class="fn org" | Hunston
| class="adr" | West Sussex
| class="note" | 
| class="note" | 
|- class="vcard"
| class="fn org" | Hunston
| class="adr" | Suffolk
| class="note" | 
| class="note" | 
|- class="vcard"
| class="fn org" | Hunston Green
| class="adr" | Suffolk
| class="note" | 
| class="note" | 
|- class="vcard"
| class="fn org" | Hunstrete
| class="adr" | Bath and North East Somerset
| class="note" | 
| class="note" | 
|- class="vcard"
| class="fn org" | Hunsworth
| class="adr" | Kirklees
| class="note" | 
| class="note" | 
|- class="vcard"
| class="fn org" | Hunt End
| class="adr" | Worcestershire
| class="note" | 
| class="note" | 
|- class="vcard"
| class="fn org" | Huntenhull Green
| class="adr" | Wiltshire
| class="note" | 
| class="note" | 
|- class="vcard"
| class="fn org" | Huntercombe End
| class="adr" | Oxfordshire
| class="note" | 
| class="note" | 
|- class="vcard"
| class="fn org" | Hunters Forstal
| class="adr" | Kent
| class="note" | 
| class="note" | 
|- class="vcard"
| class="fn org" | Hunter's Quay
| class="adr" | Argyll and Bute
| class="note" | 
| class="note" | 
|- class="vcard"
| class="fn org" | Huntham
| class="adr" | Somerset
| class="note" | 
| class="note" | 
|- class="vcard"
| class="fn org" | Huntingdon
| class="adr" | Cambridgeshire
| class="note" | 
| class="note" | 
|- class="vcard"
| class="fn org" | Huntingfield
| class="adr" | Suffolk
| class="note" | 
| class="note" | 
|- class="vcard"
| class="fn org" | Huntingford
| class="adr" | Dorset
| class="note" | 
| class="note" | 
|- class="vcard"
| class="fn org" | Huntingford
| class="adr" | South Gloucestershire
| class="note" | 
| class="note" | 
|- class="vcard"
| class="fn org" | Huntington
| class="adr" | Cheshire
| class="note" | 
| class="note" | 
|- class="vcard"
| class="fn org" | Huntington
| class="adr" | East Lothian
| class="note" | 
| class="note" | 
|- class="vcard"
| class="fn org" | Huntington (parish)
| class="adr" | Herefordshire
| class="note" | 
| class="note" | 
|- class="vcard"
| class="fn org" | Huntington (Hereford)
| class="adr" | Herefordshire
| class="note" | 
| class="note" | 
|- class="vcard"
| class="fn org" | Huntington
| class="adr" | Shropshire
| class="note" | 
| class="note" | 
|- class="vcard"
| class="fn org" | Huntington
| class="adr" | Staffordshire
| class="note" | 
| class="note" | 
|- class="vcard"
| class="fn org" | Huntington
| class="adr" | York
| class="note" | 
| class="note" | 
|- class="vcard"
| class="fn org" | Huntingtower
| class="adr" | Perth and Kinross
| class="note" | 
| class="note" | 
|- class="vcard"
| class="fn org" | Huntingtower Haugh
| class="adr" | Perth and Kinross
| class="note" | 
| class="note" | 
|- class="vcard"
| class="fn org" | Huntley
| class="adr" | Gloucestershire
| class="note" | 
| class="note" | 
|- class="vcard"
| class="fn org" | Huntley
| class="adr" | Staffordshire
| class="note" | 
| class="note" | 
|- class="vcard"
| class="fn org" | Huntly
| class="adr" | Aberdeenshire
| class="note" | 
| class="note" | 
|- class="vcard"
| class="fn org" | Hunton
| class="adr" | Hampshire
| class="note" | 
| class="note" | 
|- class="vcard"
| class="fn org" | Hunton
| class="adr" | Kent
| class="note" | 
| class="note" | 
|- class="vcard"
| class="fn org" | Hunton
| class="adr" | North Yorkshire
| class="note" | 
| class="note" | 
|- class="vcard"
| class="fn org" | Hunton Bridge
| class="adr" | Hertfordshire
| class="note" | 
| class="note" | 
|- class="vcard"
| class="fn org" | Hunt's Corner
| class="adr" | Norfolk
| class="note" | 
| class="note" | 
|- class="vcard"
| class="fn org" | Huntscott
| class="adr" | Somerset
| class="note" | 
| class="note" | 
|- class="vcard"
| class="fn org" | Hunt's Cross
| class="adr" | Liverpool
| class="note" | 
| class="note" | 
|- class="vcard"
| class="fn org" | Hunts Green
| class="adr" | Warwickshire
| class="note" | 
| class="note" | 
|- class="vcard"
| class="fn org" | Hunt's Green
| class="adr" | Buckinghamshire
| class="note" | 
| class="note" | 
|- class="vcard"
| class="fn org" | Hunts Green
| class="adr" | Berkshire
| class="note" | 
| class="note" | 
|- class="vcard"
| class="fn org" | Huntsham
| class="adr" | Devon
| class="note" | 
| class="note" | 
|- class="vcard"
| class="fn org" | Huntshaw
| class="adr" | Devon
| class="note" | 
| class="note" | 
|- class="vcard"
| class="fn org" | Huntshaw Water
| class="adr" | Devon
| class="note" | 
| class="note" | 
|- class="vcard"
| class="fn org" | Hunt's Hill
| class="adr" | Buckinghamshire
| class="note" | 
| class="note" | 
|- class="vcard"
| class="fn org" | Hunt's Lane
| class="adr" | Leicestershire
| class="note" | 
| class="note" | 
|- class="vcard"
| class="fn org" | Huntstile
| class="adr" | Somerset
| class="note" | 
| class="note" | 
|- class="vcard"
| class="fn org" | Huntworth
| class="adr" | Somerset
| class="note" | 
| class="note" | 
|- class="vcard"
| class="fn org" | Hunwick
| class="adr" | Durham
| class="note" | 
| class="note" | 
|- class="vcard"
| class="fn org" | Hunworth
| class="adr" | Norfolk
| class="note" | 
| class="note" | 
|}

Hur-Huy

|- class="vcard"
| class="fn org" | Hurcot (Somerton)
| class="adr" | Somerset
| class="note" | 
| class="note" | 
|- class="vcard"
| class="fn org" | Hurcott (Seavington St Mary)
| class="adr" | Somerset
| class="note" | 
| class="note" | 
|- class="vcard"
| class="fn org" | Hurcott
| class="adr" | Worcestershire
| class="note" | 
| class="note" | 
|- class="vcard"
| class="fn org" | Hurdcott
| class="adr" | Wiltshire
| class="note" | 
| class="note" | 
|- class="vcard"
| class="fn org" | Hurdley
| class="adr" | Powys
| class="note" | 
| class="note" | 
|- class="vcard"
| class="fn org" | Hurdsfield
| class="adr" | Cheshire
| class="note" | 
| class="note" | 
|- class="vcard"
| class="fn org" | Hurgill
| class="adr" | North Yorkshire
| class="note" | 
| class="note" | 
|- class="vcard"
| class="fn org" | Hurlet
| class="adr" | East Renfrewshire
| class="note" | 
| class="note" | 
|- class="vcard"
| class="fn org" | Hurley
| class="adr" | Warwickshire
| class="note" | 
| class="note" | 
|- class="vcard"
| class="fn org" | Hurley
| class="adr" | Berkshire
| class="note" | 
| class="note" | 
|- class="vcard"
| class="fn org" | Hurley Bottom
| class="adr" | Berkshire
| class="note" | 
| class="note" | 
|- class="vcard"
| class="fn org" | Hurley Common
| class="adr" | Warwickshire
| class="note" | 
| class="note" | 
|- class="vcard"
| class="fn org" | Hurlford
| class="adr" | East Ayrshire
| class="note" | 
| class="note" | 
|- class="vcard"
| class="fn org" | Hurliness
| class="adr" | Orkney Islands
| class="note" | 
| class="note" | 
|- class="vcard"
| class="fn org" | Hurlston
| class="adr" | Lancashire
| class="note" | 
| class="note" | 
|- class="vcard"
| class="fn org" | Hurlston Green
| class="adr" | Lancashire
| class="note" | 
| class="note" | 
|- class="vcard"
| class="fn org" | Hurn
| class="adr" | Dorset
| class="note" | 
| class="note" | 
|- class="vcard"
| class="fn org" | Hurn
| class="adr" | East Riding of Yorkshire
| class="note" | 
| class="note" | 
|- class="vcard"
| class="fn org" | Hurn's End
| class="adr" | Lincolnshire
| class="note" | 
| class="note" | 
|- class="vcard"
| class="fn org" | Hursey
| class="adr" | Dorset
| class="note" | 
| class="note" | 
|- class="vcard"
| class="fn org" | Hursley
| class="adr" | Hampshire
| class="note" | 
| class="note" | 
|- class="vcard"
| class="fn org" | Hurst
| class="adr" | Berkshire
| class="note" | 
| class="note" | 
|- class="vcard"
| class="fn org" | Hurst
| class="adr" | Cumbria
| class="note" | 
| class="note" | 
|- class="vcard"
| class="fn org" | Hurst
| class="adr" | Dorset
| class="note" | 
| class="note" | 
|- class="vcard"
| class="fn org" | Hurst
| class="adr" | Bexley
| class="note" | 
| class="note" | 
|- class="vcard"
| class="fn org" | Hurst
| class="adr" | North Yorkshire
| class="note" | 
| class="note" | 
|- class="vcard"
| class="fn org" | Hurst
| class="adr" | Somerset
| class="note" | 
| class="note" | 
|- class="vcard"
| class="fn org" | Hurst
| class="adr" | Tameside
| class="note" | 
| class="note" | 
|- class="vcard"
| class="fn org" | Hurstbourne Priors
| class="adr" | Hampshire
| class="note" | 
| class="note" | 
|- class="vcard"
| class="fn org" | Hurstbourne Tarrant
| class="adr" | Hampshire
| class="note" | 
| class="note" | 
|- class="vcard"
| class="fn org" | Hurstead
| class="adr" | Rochdale
| class="note" | 
| class="note" | 
|- class="vcard"
| class="fn org" | Hurst Green
| class="adr" | East Sussex
| class="note" | 
| class="note" | 
|- class="vcard"
| class="fn org" | Hurst Green
| class="adr" | Dudley
| class="note" | 
| class="note" | 
|- class="vcard"
| class="fn org" | Hurst Green
| class="adr" | Essex
| class="note" | 
| class="note" | 
|- class="vcard"
| class="fn org" | Hurst Green
| class="adr" | Surrey
| class="note" | 
| class="note" | 
|- class="vcard"
| class="fn org" | Hurst Green
| class="adr" | Lancashire
| class="note" | 
| class="note" | 
|- class="vcard"
| class="fn org" | Hurst Hill
| class="adr" | Dudley
| class="note" | 
| class="note" | 
|- class="vcard"
| class="fn org" | Hurstley
| class="adr" | Herefordshire
| class="note" | 
| class="note" | 
|- class="vcard"
| class="fn org" | Hurst Park
| class="adr" | Surrey
| class="note" | 
| class="note" | 
|- class="vcard"
| class="fn org" | Hurstpierpoint
| class="adr" | West Sussex
| class="note" | 
| class="note" | 
|- class="vcard"
| class="fn org" | Hurst Wickham
| class="adr" | West Sussex
| class="note" | 
| class="note" | 
|- class="vcard"
| class="fn org" | Hurstwood
| class="adr" | Lancashire
| class="note" | 
| class="note" | 
|- class="vcard"
| class="fn org" | Hurtmore
| class="adr" | Surrey
| class="note" | 
| class="note" | 
|- class="vcard"
| class="fn org" | Hurworth-on-Tees
| class="adr" | Darlington
| class="note" | 
| class="note" | 
|- class="vcard"
| class="fn org" | Hurworth Place
| class="adr" | Darlington
| class="note" | 
| class="note" | 
|- class="vcard"
| class="fn org" | Hury
| class="adr" | Durham
| class="note" | 
| class="note" | 
|- class="vcard"
| class="fn org" | Husbands Bosworth
| class="adr" | Leicestershire
| class="note" | 
| class="note" | 
|- class="vcard"
| class="fn org" | Husborne Crawley
| class="adr" | Bedfordshire
| class="note" | 
| class="note" | 
|- class="vcard"
| class="fn org" | Hushinish
| class="adr" | Western Isles
| class="note" | 
| class="note" | 
|- class="vcard"
| class="fn org" | Hushinish Point
| class="adr" | Western Isles
| class="note" | 
| class="note" | 
|- class="vcard"
| class="fn org" | Huskeiran
| class="adr" | Western Isles
| class="note" | 
| class="note" | 
|- class="vcard"
| class="fn org" | Husthwaite
| class="adr" | North Yorkshire
| class="note" | 
| class="note" | 
|- class="vcard"
| class="fn org" | Hutcherleigh
| class="adr" | Devon
| class="note" | 
| class="note" | 
|- class="vcard"
| class="fn org" | Hutchesontown
| class="adr" | City of Glasgow
| class="note" | 
| class="note" | 
|- class="vcard"
| class="fn org" | Hut Green
| class="adr" | North Yorkshire
| class="note" | 
| class="note" | 
|- class="vcard"
| class="fn org" | Huthwaite
| class="adr" | Nottinghamshire
| class="note" | 
| class="note" | 
|- class="vcard"
| class="fn org" | Hutlerburn
| class="adr" | Scottish Borders
| class="note" | 
| class="note" | 
|- class="vcard"
| class="fn org" | Huttock Top
| class="adr" | Lancashire
| class="note" | 
| class="note" | 
|- class="vcard"
| class="fn org" | Huttoft
| class="adr" | Lincolnshire
| class="note" | 
| class="note" | 
|- class="vcard"
| class="fn org" | Hutton
| class="adr" | Cumbria
| class="note" | 
| class="note" | 
|- class="vcard"
| class="fn org" | Hutton
| class="adr" | East Riding of Yorkshire
| class="note" | 
| class="note" | 
|- class="vcard"
| class="fn org" | Hutton
| class="adr" | Essex
| class="note" | 
| class="note" | 
|- class="vcard"
| class="fn org" | Hutton
| class="adr" | Lancashire
| class="note" | 
| class="note" | 
|- class="vcard"
| class="fn org" | Hutton
| class="adr" | North Somerset
| class="note" | 
| class="note" | 
|- class="vcard"
| class="fn org" | Hutton
| class="adr" | Scottish Borders
| class="note" | 
| class="note" | 
|- class="vcard"
| class="fn org" | Hutton Bonville
| class="adr" | North Yorkshire
| class="note" | 
| class="note" | 
|- class="vcard"
| class="fn org" | Hutton Buscel
| class="adr" | North Yorkshire
| class="note" | 
| class="note" | 
|- class="vcard"
| class="fn org" | Hutton Conyers
| class="adr" | North Yorkshire
| class="note" | 
| class="note" | 
|- class="vcard"
| class="fn org" | Hutton Cranswick
| class="adr" | East Riding of Yorkshire
| class="note" | 
| class="note" | 
|- class="vcard"
| class="fn org" | Hutton End
| class="adr" | Cumbria
| class="note" | 
| class="note" | 
|- class="vcard"
| class="fn org" | Hutton Gate
| class="adr" | Redcar and Cleveland
| class="note" | 
| class="note" | 
|- class="vcard"
| class="fn org" | Hutton Hang
| class="adr" | North Yorkshire
| class="note" | 
| class="note" | 
|- class="vcard"
| class="fn org" | Hutton Henry
| class="adr" | Durham
| class="note" | 
| class="note" | 
|- class="vcard"
| class="fn org" | Hutton-le-Hole
| class="adr" | North Yorkshire
| class="note" | 
| class="note" | 
|- class="vcard"
| class="fn org" | Hutton Magna
| class="adr" | Durham
| class="note" | 
| class="note" | 
|- class="vcard"
| class="fn org" | Hutton Mount
| class="adr" | Essex
| class="note" | 
| class="note" | 
|- class="vcard"
| class="fn org" | Hutton Roof (Eden)
| class="adr" | Cumbria
| class="note" | 
| class="note" | 
|- class="vcard"
| class="fn org" | Hutton Roof (South Lakeland)
| class="adr" | Cumbria
| class="note" | 
| class="note" | 
|- class="vcard"
| class="fn org" | Hutton Rudby
| class="adr" | North Yorkshire
| class="note" | 
| class="note" | 
|- class="vcard"
| class="fn org" | Huttons Ambo
| class="adr" | North Yorkshire
| class="note" | 
| class="note" | 
|- class="vcard"
| class="fn org" | Hutton Sessay
| class="adr" | North Yorkshire
| class="note" | 
| class="note" | 
|- class="vcard"
| class="fn org" | Hutton Village
| class="adr" | Redcar and Cleveland
| class="note" | 
| class="note" | 
|- class="vcard"
| class="fn org" | Hutton Wandesley
| class="adr" | North Yorkshire
| class="note" | 
| class="note" | 
|- class="vcard"
| class="fn org" | Huxham
| class="adr" | Devon
| class="note" | 
| class="note" | 
|- class="vcard"
| class="fn org" | Huxham Green
| class="adr" | Somerset
| class="note" | 
| class="note" | 
|- class="vcard"
| class="fn org" | Huxley
| class="adr" | Cheshire
| class="note" | 
| class="note" | 
|- class="vcard"
| class="fn org" | Huxter
| class="adr" | Shetland Islands
| class="note" | 
| class="note" | 
|- class="vcard"
| class="fn org" | Huyton
| class="adr" | Knowsley
| class="note" | 
| class="note" | 
|- class="vcard"
| class="fn org" | Huyton Park
| class="adr" | Knowsley
| class="note" | 
| class="note" | 
|- class="vcard"
| class="fn org" | Huyton Quarry
| class="adr" | Knowsley
| class="note" | 
| class="note" | 
|- class="vcard"
| class="fn org" | Huyton-With-Roby
| class="adr" | Knowsley
| class="note" | 
| class="note" | 
|}

Hw

|- class="vcard"
| class="fn org" | Hwlffordd
| class="adr" | (Haverfordwest)  Pembrokeshire
| class="note" | 
| class="note" | 
|}

Hy

|- class="vcard"
| class="fn org" | Hycemoor
| class="adr" | Cumbria
| class="note" | 
| class="note" | 
|- class="vcard"
| class="fn org" | Hyde
| class="adr" | Dorset
| class="note" | 
| class="note" | 
|- class="vcard"
| class="fn org" | Hyde (Minchinhampton)
| class="adr" | Gloucestershire
| class="note" | 
| class="note" | 
|- class="vcard"
| class="fn org" | Hyde (Temple Guiting)
| class="adr" | Gloucestershire
| class="note" | 
| class="note" | 
|- class="vcard"
| class="fn org" | Hyde
| class="adr" | Tameside
| class="note" | 
| class="note" | 
|- class="vcard"
| class="fn org" | Hyde (New Forest)
| class="adr" | Hampshire
| class="note" | 
| class="note" | 
|- class="vcard"
| class="fn org" | Hyde (Winchester)
| class="adr" | Hampshire
| class="note" | 
| class="note" | 
|- class="vcard"
| class="fn org" | Hyde
| class="adr" | Herefordshire
| class="note" | 
| class="note" | 
|- class="vcard"
| class="fn org" | Hyde Chase
| class="adr" | Essex
| class="note" | 
| class="note" | 
|- class="vcard"
| class="fn org" | Hyde End
| class="adr" | Buckinghamshire
| class="note" | 
| class="note" | 
|- class="vcard"
| class="fn org" | Hyde Heath
| class="adr" | Buckinghamshire
| class="note" | 
| class="note" | 
|- class="vcard"
| class="fn org" | Hyde Lea
| class="adr" | Staffordshire
| class="note" | 
| class="note" | 
|- class="vcard"
| class="fn org" | Hyde Park
| class="adr" | Sheffield
| class="note" | 
| class="note" | 
|- class="vcard"
| class="fn org" | Hydestile
| class="adr" | Surrey
| class="note" | 
| class="note" | 
|- class="vcard"
| class="fn org" | Hylton Castle
| class="adr" | Sunderland
| class="note" | 
| class="note" | 
|- class="vcard"
| class="fn org" | Hylton Red House
| class="adr" | Sunderland
| class="note" | 
| class="note" | 
|- class="vcard"
| class="fn org" | Hyltons Crossways
| class="adr" | Norfolk
| class="note" | 
| class="note" | 
|- class="vcard"
| class="fn org" | Hyndburn Bridge
| class="adr" | Lancashire
| class="note" | 
| class="note" | 
|- class="vcard"
| class="fn org" | Hyndford Bridge
| class="adr" | South Lanarkshire
| class="note" | 
| class="note" | 
|- class="vcard"
| class="fn org" | Hyndhope
| class="adr" | Scottish Borders
| class="note" | 
| class="note" | 
|- class="vcard"
| class="fn org" | Hynish
| class="adr" | Argyll and Bute
| class="note" | 
| class="note" | 
|- class="vcard"
| class="fn org" | Hysbackie
| class="adr" | Highland
| class="note" | 
| class="note" | 
|- class="vcard"
| class="fn org" | Hyssington
| class="adr" | Powys
| class="note" | 
| class="note" | 
|- class="vcard"
| class="fn org" | Hystfield
| class="adr" | South Gloucestershire
| class="note" | 
| class="note" | 
|- class="vcard"
| class="fn org" | Hythe
| class="adr" | Kent
| class="note" | 
| class="note" | 
|- class="vcard"
| class="fn org" | Hythe
| class="adr" | Hampshire
| class="note" | 
| class="note" | 
|- class="vcard"
| class="fn org" | Hythe
| class="adr" | Surrey
| class="note" | 
| class="note" | 
|- class="vcard"
| class="fn org" | Hythe
| class="adr" | Somerset
| class="note" | 
| class="note" | 
|- class="vcard"
| class="fn org" | Hythe End
| class="adr" | Windsor and Maidenhead
| class="note" | 
| class="note" | 
|- class="vcard"
| class="fn org" | Hythie
| class="adr" | Aberdeenshire
| class="note" | 
| class="note" | 
|- class="vcard"
| class="fn org" | Hyton
| class="adr" | Cumbria
| class="note" | 
| class="note" | 
|}